Richard Meares Sly (17 December 1849 – 11 October 1929) was an Australian lawyer, judge of the Supreme Court of New South Wales from 1908 to 1919.

Biography
Sly was born in Sydney, the third son of Joseph Sly. He was educated at Sydney Grammar School and Sydney University, in a stellar academic career, winning the Gilchrist travelling scholarship in April, 1872. This enabled him to pursue legal studies at London University, where he qualified LLB.
He was called to the Bar at the Middle Temple in June 1875 and was appointed an Acting Justice of the Supreme Court of New South Wales in June, 1898 and was appointed KC in 1904 and appointed to the NSW Supreme Court in February 1908, following the retirement of Sir William Owen.

He retired from the Supreme Court in December 1919, to be replaced by Sir Charles Wade.

He died suddenly at Burradoo, near Bowral, on a visit to his brother, solicitor Dr. George Sly (c. 1846–1934). 
His remains were interred at the South Head Cemetery.

Family
Sly married Constance Adelaide Mullens (d. 21 September 1949) on 21 December 1887. They had four daughters:
Marion Constance Meares Sly (d. 25 March 1969) married Duncan S. Maxwell.
Helen Meares Sly married ? Terry.
Viola Margaret Meares Sly (died 11 January 1967) married Keith Ferguson, son of Justice Ferguson of "Wimbledon", Potts Point, on 23 March 1921.
Edith Nereda Meares Sly (d. 8 May 1987) married John O. Stevenson.
They had a home at Wunulla Road, Point Piper, Sydney.

References

External links 

 Sly, Richard Meares (1849–1929) entry in the Australian Dictionary of Biography

1849 births
1929 deaths
Judges of the Supreme Court of New South Wales
University of Sydney alumni
Alumni of the University of London